Hugo Vasconcelos Osteti (born 25 October 1993) is a Brazilian male BMX rider and track cyclist. He competed in the team sprint event at the 2015 UCI Track Cycling World Championships.

Hugo has done BMX Racing for 16 years and Track Cycling for 3 years.

 Gold Pan American 
 Gold Latin American 3x 
 Champion National 5x 
 Champion State 4x 
 Champion Brazil Cup 6x 
 Champion Regional Bronze 
 Pan American Games 
 Bronze Pan American

Note

References

External links
 
  (archive)

1993 births
Living people
BMX riders
Brazilian BMX riders
Brazilian track cyclists
Brazilian male cyclists
Pan American Games bronze medalists for Brazil
Pan American Games medalists in cycling
Cyclists at the 2015 Pan American Games
Medalists at the 2015 Pan American Games
Place of birth missing (living people)
21st-century Brazilian people
20th-century Brazilian people